Knecht, in German and Dutch, means a male servant. Etymologically, it is the cognate of English "knight". 

It may also refer to:
People
 Émile Knecht (1923–2019), Swiss rower
 Guillaume Knecht, rugby league footballer of the 1990s and 2000s
 Hans Knecht (1913–1996), Swiss road racing cyclist
 John Knecht (born 1947), American filmmaker
 Justin Heinrich Knecht (1752–1817), German composer
 Karl Kae Knecht (1883–1972),  American artist
 Peter Knecht (born 1936), American attorney
 Reuben Knecht Bachman (1834–1911), American politician
 Robert Knecht (born 1926), British historian
 Bill Knecht (1930–1996), American rower
Companies
 Gebr. Knecht AG, a Swiss bus transportation company

References

See also 
 Kleinknecht, Wagenknecht
 Knecht Ruprecht, companion of Saint Nicholas in German folklore
 Knechtel, a surname

Occupational surnames